The 1832 United States presidential election in Delaware took place between November 2 and December 5, 1832, as part of the 1832 United States presidential election. Voters chose three representatives, or electors to the Electoral College, who voted for President and Vice President.

Delaware voted for the National Republican candidate, Henry Clay, over the Democratic Party candidate, Andrew Jackson. Clay won the state by a narrow margin of 1.98%. This was the first election in which Delaware voted by popular vote for President in a contested election. It had used the Congressional District Method in the uncontested Election of 1788-89, but had since changed to selecting its electors through the state legislature from 1792-1828.

Results

See also
 United States presidential elections in Delaware

References

Delaware
1832
1832 Delaware elections